The Man Who Knew Too Much is a 1956 American suspense thriller film directed and produced by Alfred Hitchcock, starring James Stewart and Doris Day. The film is Hitchcock's second film using this title, following his own 1934 film of the same name but featuring a significantly different plot and script.

In the book-length interview Hitchcock/Truffaut (1967), in response to fellow filmmaker François Truffaut's assertion that aspects of the remake were by far superior, Hitchcock replied, "Let's say the first version is the work of a talented amateur and the second was made by a professional."

The film won an Academy Award for Best Original Song for "Que Sera, Sera (Whatever Will Be, Will Be)", sung by Doris Day. It premiered at the 1956 Cannes Film Festival on April 29.

Plot

An American family – Dr. Benjamin "Ben" McKenna, his wife, popular singer Josephine “Jo” Conway McKenna, and their son Henry "Hank" McKenna – are vacationing in French Morocco. Traveling from Casablanca to Marrakesh, they meet Frenchman Louis Bernard. He seems friendly, but Jo is suspicious of his many questions and evasive answers.

Bernard offers to take the McKennas to dinner, but cancels when a suspicious-looking man knocks at the McKennas' hotel-room door. At a restaurant, the McKennas meet friendly English couple Lucy and Edward Drayton. The McKennas are surprised to see Bernard arrive and sit elsewhere, apparently ignoring them.

The next day, visiting a Moroccan market with the Draytons, the McKennas see a man chased by police. After being stabbed in the back, the man approaches Ben, who discovers he is Bernard in disguise. The dying Bernard whispers that a foreign statesman will be assassinated in London and that Ben must tell the authorities about "Ambrose Chappell". Lucy returns Hank to the hotel while Ben, Jo and Edward go to a police station for questioning about Bernard's death. An officer explains that Bernard was a French Intelligence agent.

Ben receives a phone call at the police station; Hank was kidnapped but will not be harmed if the McKennas say nothing to the police about Bernard's warning. Knowing Hank was left in Lucy's care, Ben dispatches Edward to locate him. When Ben and Jo return to the hotel, they discover Edward checked out. Ben realizes the Draytons are the couple Bernard was looking for and are involved in Hank's abduction. When he learns the Draytons are from London, he decides he and Jo should go there and try to find them through Ambrose Chappell.

In London, Scotland Yard's Inspector Buchanan tells Jo and Ben that Bernard was in Morocco to uncover an assassination plot; they should contact him if they hear from the kidnappers. Leaving friends in their hotel suite, the McKennas search for a person named Ambrose Chappell. Jo realizes that "Ambrose Chapel" is a place, and the McKennas arrive at the chapel to find Edward leading a service. Jo leaves the chapel to call the police. After Edward sends his parishioners home, Ben confronts him and is knocked out and locked inside. Jo arrives with police, but they cannot enter without a warrant.

Jo learns that Buchanan has gone to a concert at Royal Albert Hall, and asks the police to take her there. Once the police and Jo leave, the Draytons take Hank to a foreign embassy. In the Royal Albert Hall lobby, Jo sees the man who came to her door in Morocco. When he threatens to harm Hank if she interferes, she realizes he is the assassin sent to kill the foreign prime minister.

Ben escapes the chapel through its bell tower and reaches the Royal Albert Hall, where Jo points out the assassin. Ben searches the balcony boxes for the killer, who is waiting for a cymbal crash to mask his gunshot. Just before the cymbals crash, Jo screams and the assassin misses his mark, only wounding his target. Ben struggles with the would-be killer, who falls to his death.

Concluding that Hank is likely to be at the embassy, but that it is sovereign and exempt from an investigation, the McKennas secure an invitation from the grateful prime minister. The ambassador organized the plot to kill the prime minister, and blames the failed attempt on the Draytons. Knowing that Hank can testify against them, he orders the Draytons to kill the boy.

The prime minister asks Jo to sing. She loudly performs "Que Sera, Sera", so that Hank will hear her. Lucy, who is guarding Hank while Edward prepares to murder him, is distressed at the prospect of killing a child, so she encourages the boy to whistle along with the song. Ben finds Hank. Edward tries escaping with them at gunpoint, but when Ben hits him, he falls down the stairs to his death.

The McKennas return to their hotel suite. Ben explains to their now-sleeping friends, "I'm sorry we were gone so long, but we had to go over and pick up Hank."

Cast

 James Stewart as Dr. Benjamin "Ben" McKenna
 Doris Day as Josephine “Jo” Conway McKenna
 Bernard Miles as Edward Drayton 
 Brenda de Banzie as Lucy Drayton
 Christopher Olsen as Henry "Hank" McKenna
 Ralph Truman as Inspector Buchanan
 Daniel Gélin as Louis Bernard
 Mogens Wieth as Ambassador
 Alan Mowbray as Val Parnell
 Hillary Brooke as Jan Peterson
 Reggie Nalder as Rien
 Richard Wattis as Assistant Manager
 Noel Willman as Woburn
 Alix Talton as Helen Parnell
 Yves Brainville as Police Inspector in Marrakech
 Carolyn Jones as Cindy Fontaine
 John Barrard as Taxidermist (uncredited)

Alfred Hitchcock's cameo is a signature occurrence in most of his films. In The Man Who Knew Too Much he can be seen 25:42 into the film, in the lower left corner, watching acrobats in the Moroccan market, with his back to the camera, wearing a light gray suit, and putting his hands into his pockets, just before the spy is killed.  Bernard Herrmann, who wrote the film score, cameos as the conductor at Royal Albert Hall, the only time Herrmann appeared on-camera in a film.

Production
Alfred Hitchcock first considered an American remake of The Man Who Knew Too Much in 1941, but only brought back the idea in 1956 to make a film that would fulfill a contractual demand from Paramount Pictures. The studio agreed it was a picture that could be well-adapted to the new decade. The Royal Albert Hall sequence drew some inspiration from H.M. Bateman's comic "The One-Note Man", which followed the daily life of a musician who plays only one note in a symphony, similar to the cymbal player in the film.

Writing
Screenwriter John Michael Hayes was hired on the condition that he would not watch the early version nor read its script, with all the plot details coming from a briefing with Hitchcock. Only the opening scenes of the script were ready when filming began, and Hayes had to send the subsequent script pages by airmail as he finished them.

Soundtrack
Hitchcock's frequent composer Bernard Herrmann wrote the "background" film score; however, the performance of Arthur Benjamin's Storm Clouds Cantata, conducted by Herrmann, is used as source music for the climax of the film. Herrmann was given the option of composing a new cantata to be performed during the film's climax. However, he found Arthur Benjamin's cantata Storm Clouds from the original 1934 film to be so well suited to the film that he declined, although he did expand the orchestration, and inserted several repeats to make the sequence longer. Herrmann can be seen conducting the London Symphony Orchestra with mezzo-soprano Barbara Howitt and chorus during the Royal Albert Hall scenes. The sequence in the Royal Albert Hall runs for 12 minutes without any dialogue from the beginning of Storm Clouds Cantata until the climax when Doris Day's character screams.

Doris Day's character in the film is a well-known, now retired, professional singer, and at two points in the film she sings the Livingston and Evans song "Que Sera, Sera (Whatever Will Be, Will Be)", a performance which won the 1956 Academy Award for Best Original Song. Day's recording of the song reached number two on the US pop charts. and number one in the UK.

Reception
Reviews for the film were generally positive, although some critics expressed a preference for the 1934 original. Bosley Crowther of The New York Times wrote, "James Stewart tops his job in 'Rear Window' as the man who knows too much, and Doris Day is surprisingly effective as the mother who is frantic about her child ... Even in mammoth VistaVision, the old Hitchcock thriller-stuff has punch." Variety wrote that while Hitchcock draws "the footage out a bit long at 119 minutes, he still keeps suspense working at all times and gets strong performances from the two stars and other cast members." Harrison's Reports called the film a "highly exciting and entertaining suspense thriller" that "grips the audience from start to finish." Richard L. Coe of The Washington Post also liked the film, calling it "a dandy of its popular kind" if "a wee bit too leisurely." John McCarten of The New Yorker wrote in a negative review that while the remake was "unquestionably bigger and shinier than the original, it doesn't move along with anything like the agility of its predecessor. There can be no doubt, of course, that Mr. Hitchcock at one time was a master of celluloid suspense, but increasingly of late he has been turning out movies that are too overweight to indulge in the tricks of his salad days." The Monthly Film Bulletin wrote: "Although a quite entertaining thriller, with some characteristically shrewd and caustic Hitchcock touches, it is likely to disappoint devotees of the first film. It lacks the earlier pace and excitement; the peculiarly English charm of the original has been exchanged for a vague VistaVision and Technicolor cosmopolitanism; the dentist episode and the siege climax are unhappily missing." C. A. Lejeune of The Observer wrote that the plot had "a tendency to meander" with "jokes that may have looked more humorous in typescript," concluding that the film was "strong" as long as it stuck to the main plot, "But the first 'Man Who Knew Too Much' was stronger in every way."

The film was a commercial success. Filmed on a budget of $1.2 million, it grossed $11,333,333 at the domestic box office, earning $4.1 million in US theatrical rentals.

On the review aggregator Rotten Tomatoes, the film has an approval score of 87% based on 39 reviews, with an average rating of 7.80/10. The site's consensus reads, "Remaking his own 1934 film, Hitchcock imbues The Man Who Knew Too Much with picturesque locales and international intrigue, and is helped by a brilliantly befuddled performance from James Stewart."

In 2004, American Film Institute included the song "Que Sera, Sera (Whatever Will Be, Will Be)" as No. 48 in AFI's 100 Years...100 Songs.

Home media
The Man Who Knew Too Much was kept out of re-release by Hitchcock until 1983 when it was acquired by Universal Pictures. The film has been released on home video by Universal Pictures Home Entertainment in VHS, Betamax, Laserdisc, DVD and Blu-ray formats. The 2000 DVD has a documentary on the making of the film, including interviews with Hitchcock's daughter Patricia Hitchcock and members of the production crew.

See also
List of American films of 1956
Djemaa el Fna – Marrakesh marketplace
"Mr. Yin Presents" – an episode of Psych based completely on Alfred Hitchcock films

Notes

References

External links

 
 
 
 
 
 Movie stills
 Review at Radiotimes.com
 Alfred Hitchcock Wiki:The Man Who Knew Too Much (1956)
 Film locations

1956 films
1950s mystery thriller films
1950s psychological thriller films
1950s spy thriller films
American mystery thriller films
American political thriller films
American remakes of British films
1950s French-language films
Film noir
Films about assassinations
Films about child abduction
Films about vacationing
Films directed by Alfred Hitchcock
Films produced by Alfred Hitchcock
Films scored by Bernard Herrmann
Films set in London
Films set in Morocco
Films that won the Best Original Song Academy Award
Films with screenplays by John Michael Hayes
Paramount Pictures films
1950s English-language films
1950s American films